Ajit Pal Singh Kohli is an Indian politician.

Political career
He was elected as the MLA in the 2022 Punjab Legislative Assembly election.  He represented the Patiala Assembly constituency in the Punjab Legislative Assembly. He defeated the former CM of Punjab Amarinder Singh in the election. The Aam Aadmi Party gained a strong 79% majority in the sixteenth Punjab Legislative Assembly by winning 92 out of 117 seats in the 2022 Punjab Legislative Assembly election. MP Bhagwant Mann was sworn in as Chief Minister on 16 March 2022.

Member of Legislative Assembly
He represents the Patiala Assembly constituency as MLA in Punjab Assembly.

Committee assignments of Punjab Legislative Assembly   
Member (2022–23) Committee on Local Bodies
Member (2022–23) Committee on Subordinate Legislation

Electoral Performance

References

Living people
Punjab, India MLAs 2022–2027
Aam Aadmi Party politicians from Punjab, India
Year of birth missing (living people)